Punta San Francisquito Airfield  is a public airfield located in Punta San Francisquito, Municipality of Ensenada, Baja California, Mexico, on the Gulf of California coast. The airfield is used solely for general aviation purposes. It has two runways, one with asphalt pavement and the other with packed dirt surface. Pavement (16-34) is not maintained and can be broken, packed dirt (15-33) is fully operational. Bring your own tie down ropes. Radio frequencies are 122.8 for Unicom (not always monitored) and 126.3 for Mazatlan Center. The airstrip parking is less than 200 feet from the main resort area.

External links
PSF at Our Airports

Airports in Baja California